Carlo Rizzo (April 30, 1907 – July 26, 1979) was an Italian stage and film actor. He was the brother of the actor Alfredo Rizzo.

A regular in post-war Italian cinema he also featured in several American films produced in Italy.

Selected filmography
 Defendant, Stand Up! (1939)
 Lo vedi come sei... lo vedi come sei? (1939)
 The Pirate's Dream (1940)
 Il fanciullo del West (1943)
 Charley's Aunt (1943)
 Macario Against Zagomar (1944)
 L'eroe della strada (1948)
 How I Discovered America (1949)
 That Ghost of My Husband (1950)
 Deported (1950)
 Il monello della strada (1951)
 When in Rome (1952)
 I, Hamlet (1952)
 The Passaguai Family Gets Rich (1952)
 My Wife, My Cow and Me (1952)
 If You Won a Hundred Million (1953)
 Roman Holiday (1953)
 The Rains of Ranchipur (1955)
 The Monte Carlo Story (1956)
 Seven Hills of Rome (1958)
 The Naked Maja (1958)
 It Started in Naples (1960)
 Swordsman of Siena (1962)
 Damon and Pythias (1962)
 Honeymoon, Italian Style (1966)
 The Biggest Bundle of Them All (1968)

References

Bibliography 
 Roberto Chiti & Roberto Poppi. Dizionario del cinema italiano: Dal 1945 al 1959. Gremese Editore, 1991.

External links 
 

1907 births
1979 deaths
Italian male stage actors
Italian male film actors
Actors from Trieste